Bhairav Aryal, born Tirtha Nath Aryal, was a writer of Nepali literature. His writings are based on the social, political, religious and cultural aspects of Nepali lifestyle, and his satirical essay compilation 'Jaya Bhudi ' still remains one of the most popular works of Nepali Literature.

Early life 

Aryal was born as the son of Khem Kumari Aryal and Homnath Aryal on 20 September 1936 in Kupondole, Lalitpur. His father worked as an accountant in Nepal Police. By the age of 12, Aryal married his wife Shova in 1948. They had three sons and three daughters.

Aryal demonstrated a strong interest in the Nepali and Sanskrit literature from his childhood and had decided to pursue his higher education in Nepali literature. He completed his MA in Nepali in 1969 and also took courses in Sanskrit. 

Initially, Aryal worked as a teacher for four years at Pokhara and Kathmandu from 1954 to 1958. However, due to a throat ailment Aryal's voice had started to worsen because of which he was forced to leave the teaching profession.  

Later, Aryal started his career as a journalist in a newspaper called "Haalkhabar". By the age of 21, he had been appointed as a full-time journalist in the government-run national daily newspaper Gorkhapatra and was later promoted in the editorial group. He also led the efforts to improve the "Madhuparka" magazine, which was a monthly literary magazine published by Gorkhapatra. He also played a strong role in the publication of another literary magazine called "Rachana".

Literary Contributions 
His first published poem was titled 'Nawa Jiwan', in the 'Prativa' magazine, which was published in 1952. Later he also published satirical essays and poems. His first published book was a poem compilation titled 'Upaban'. The next year he published 'Kaukuti', which marked his public entry in the satirical journey. In 1965, his most highly acclaimed literary work 'Jaya Bhundi' was published, which included the popular satirical essays 'Jaya Bholi' and 'Jaya Bhudi'.

Publications

Death 
Bhairav Aryal committed suicide in 5 October 1976.

References

Nepalese male writers
1936 births
1976 deaths
Nepalese writers
1976 suicides
People from Lalitpur District, Nepal
Khas people
Nepalese satirists
Suicides in Nepal